Route 202 is a collector road in the Canadian province of Nova Scotia.

It is located within the Municipality of the District of East Hants in Hants County and connects Lakelands at Trunk 1 with Nine Mile River at Trunk 14.

Communities
Lakelands 
Hillsvale 
South Rawdon  
Centre Rawdon 
Clarksville
West Gore
Gore
East Gore
Upper Nine Mile River
Cheese Factory Corner

See also
List of Nova Scotia provincial highways

References

Roads in Hants County, Nova Scotia
Nova Scotia provincial highways